Leila Khaled (born April 9, 1944) is a Palestinian refugee, former militant, and member of the Popular Front for the Liberation of Palestine (PFLP).

Khaled came to public attention for her role in the TWA Flight 840 hijacking in 1969 and one of the four simultaneous Dawson's Field hijackings the following year as part of the campaign of Black September in Jordan. The first woman to hijack an airplane, she was later released in a prisoner exchange for civilian hostages kidnapped by other PFLP members.

Early life
Khaled was born in Haifa, Mandatory Palestine, to Arab parents. Her family fled to Lebanon on April 13, 1948, as part of the 1948 Palestinian exodus, leaving her father behind. At the age of 15, following in the footsteps of her brother, she joined the pan-Arab Arab Nationalist Movement, originally established in the late-1940s by George Habash, then a medical student at the American University of Beirut. The Palestinian branch of this movement became the Popular Front for the Liberation of Palestine after the 1967 Six-Day War.

Khaled spent some time teaching in Kuwait and, in her autobiography, recounted crying the day she heard that John F. Kennedy had been assassinated.

The hijackings

TWA Flight 840 (1969)
On August 29, 1969, Khaled was part of a team that hijacked TWA Flight 840 on its way from Rome to Tel Aviv, diverting the Boeing 707 to Damascus. According to some media sources, the PFLP leadership thought that Yitzhak Rabin, then Israeli ambassador to the United States, would be on board; he was not. She claims she ordered the pilot to fly over Haifa, so she could see her birthplace. No one was injured, but after the passengers disembarked, the hijackers blew up the nose section of the aircraft. After this hijacking, and a photograph of her (taken by Eddie Adams) holding an AK-47 rifle and wearing a kaffiyeh was reproduced in many publications, she underwent six plastic surgery operations on her nose and chin to conceal her identity and allow her to take part in a future hijacking, and because she did not want to wear the face of an icon.

El Al Flight 219 (1970)
On September 6, 1970, Khaled and Patrick Argüello, a Nicaraguan–American, attempted to hijack El Al Flight 219 from Amsterdam to New York City as part of the Dawson's Field hijackings, a series of almost simultaneous hijackings carried out by the PFLP. The attack was foiled when Israeli skymarshals killed Argüello before eventually overpowering Khaled. Although she was carrying two hand grenades at the time, Khaled said she had received very strict instructions not to threaten passengers on the civilian flight. However, while being overpowered, she withdrew the safety pin from one of the grenades and rolled it down the aisle towards the economy class passengers; miraculously it did not explode and thus cause general de-pressurisation and the probable crash of the plane. Argüello had shot Vider, a member of the flight crew, twice, and the pilot Uri Bar-Lev therefore refused orders to return to Tel Aviv to bring Khaled to justice.

The pilot diverted the aircraft to Heathrow Airport in London, where the two skymarshals were smuggled on the tarmac to another El Al aircraft waiting for takeoff to Tel Aviv. Vider was rushed to hospital with minutes to live and Khaled was delivered to Ealing police station. On October 1, the British government released her in exchange for hostages taken in a further hijacking.

Later life

Khaled has stated in interviews that she developed a fondness for the United Kingdom when her first visitor in jail, an immigration officer, wanted to know why she had arrived in the country without a valid visa. She also developed a relationship with the two policewomen assigned to guard her in Ealing and later corresponded with them. Khaled continued to return to the UK for speaking engagements until as late as 2002, although she was refused a visa by the British embassy in 2005 to address a meeting at the Féile an Phobail in Belfast, where she was invited as a speaker. Eventually she managed to speak to people at the Belfast Féile through a video link.

According to Khaled, there is not an Arab-Israeli peace process. She stated "it's a political process where the balance of forces is for the Israelis and not for us. They have all the cards to play with and the Palestinians have nothing to depend on, especially when the PLO is not united." Khaled also supports the Kurdish political movement surrounding the Peoples' Democratic Party (HDP) and drew attention to the similar fate of the Palestinian and the Kurdish people She has become involved in politics, becoming a member of the Palestinian National Council and appearing regularly at the World Social Forum. 

She is married to the physician Fayez Rashid, and lives with their two sons Bader and Bashar in Amman, Jordan. She is irreligious.

She was the subject of a film entitled Leila Khaled, Hijacker, directed by Palestinian filmmaker Lina Makboul, premiered in November 2005 at the International Documentary Film Festival in Amsterdam.

In 2011, Khaled went on a speaking tour in Sweden, including speeches at May Day demonstrations of the Communist Party and the Central Organisation of the Workers of Sweden, a public art gallery, Södertörn University College and a seminar arranged by the Left Party.

In November 2017, Khaled was refused entry to Rome, Italy at the Leonardo da Vinci–Fiumicino Airport, and was forced to return to Amman, Jordan as she is a member of a group considered a terrorist organization by the Italian government.

In mid September 2020, Khaled was scheduled to speak at a virtual Zoom conference at San Francisco State University hosted by Rabab Abdulhadi and Tomomi Kinukawa. Following lobbying by the Jewish coalition group "End Jewish Hatred," Zoom Video Communications along with YouTube and Facebook, prevented the conference from using their video conferencing software and platforms, citing compliance with U.S. export control, sanctions, and anti-terrorism laws.

In popular culture

 She was the subject of an artwork portrait made entirely out of lipsticks, "The Icon", created by artist Amer Shomali using 14 colors, and 3,500 lipsticks.
 The song Like Leila Khaled Said from The Teardrop Explodes' 1981 album Wilder is a love song to Khaled. Songwriter Julian Cope said it was a love song to her "cos I thought she was so beautiful. But I know that the whole thing was like bad news."
 The second CD of Julian Cope's 2012 album Psychedelic Revolution is named "Phase of Leila Khaled". The first CD is named "'Phase of Che Guevara". The album's lyrics contain several references to political demonstrations, terrorism and suicide bombers. The accompanying booklet also contains a photo of Leila Khaled.
 As of 2018, she is commemorated in a mural at the International Wall on the Falls Road, Belfast, Northern Ireland. The mural is based upon the photograph of her by Eddie Adams, holding an AK-47 and with the Palestine flag behind her. Her image along with an image of Irish Republican, Oglach Charlie Hughes says "Our Struggle continues".
The name of Sandton Drive in Johannesburg, South Africa was controversially changed to Leila Khaled Drive by vote of the city council on November 29, 2018. The American consulate in Johannesburg is located on the street. 
 The 10th song of the album Friværdi, released on September 26, 2005, by the Danish rock band Magtens Korridorer, is entitled "Leila Khaled".
 Writer Chris Boucher has said that he named the character of savage warrior Leela from Doctor Who after Khaled.
 Khaled is mentioned by Fun-da-mental in "Mother India", on the Love India CD (2010) widely distributed in the United States by Starbucks.
 The album Olive no Ki no Shita de, released in 2007 by the Japanese rock singer Panta, features a song entitled "Leila's Ballade". This song's lyrics were written by former Japanese Red Army member Fusako Shigenobu and her daughter Mei Shigenobu. In 2012, Khaled was invited to a ceremony for the 40th anniversary of the Lod Airport massacre by a Japanese far-left group in Kyoto, at which Panta performed the song in front of Khaled.
Leila Khaled: Hijacker is a 2006 documentary about Leila Khaled by Swedish-Palestinian filmmaker Lina Makboul.

References

Sources
 Leila Khaled – hijacked by destiny, a Friday Times interview at Al-Jazeerah.info
 Interview with Aviation Security 5 September 2000 Philip Baum's edited interview with Leila Khaled
 Leila Khaled: Hijacker – Documentary by Lina Makboul

Further reading

"I made the ring from a bullet and the pin of a hand grenade" by Katharine Viner, The Guardian, January 26, 2001.
"The guerrilla's story", BBC, January 1, 2001.
Irving, Sarah. Leila Khaled: Icon of Palestinian Liberation. London/New York, Pluto Press, 2012, .
Khaled, Leila. My People Shall Live: The Autobiography of a Revolutionary. London: Hodder and Stoughton, 1973. .
MacDonald, Eileen. Shoot the Women First. London: Arrow Books, 1992, 
Snow, Peter, and Phillips, David. Leila's Hijack War: The True Story of 25 Days in September. London: Pan Books, 1970. .

1944 births
Living people
Arab Nationalist Movement
20th-century criminals
Arab socialists
Hijackers
Palestinian atheists
Palestinian Arab nationalists
Palestinian Marxists
Palestinian militants
Palestinian nationalists
Palestinian refugees
Palestinian socialists
Palestinian women in politics
People from Haifa
Popular Front for the Liberation of Palestine members
Arab women in war